Gunnar's Daughter (1909) is a short novel written by Nobel laureate Sigrid Undset (1882-1949). This was Undset's first historical novel, set at the beginning of the 11th century in Norway and Iceland.

The novel follows the tragic romance between the proud Vigdis Gunnarsdatter and the Icelandic Viga-Ljot. The major themes are rape, revenge, social codes, marriage, and children bearing the consequences of their parents' actions. The story is written using the motifs and laconic prose of the Icelandic sagas.

Characters in Gunnar's Daughter
 Vigdis Gunnarsdatter, the protagonist, raped by Ljot
 Ljot Gissursson, the antagonist, suitor of Vigdis
 Ulvar Vigdisson, son of Vigdis and Ljot
 Leikny Lytingsdatter, Ljot's wife in Iceland
 Kaare of Grefsin, friend and suitor of Vigdis
 Veterlide Glumsson, uncle and companion of Ljot
 Gunnar of Vadin, father of Vigdis
 Aesa Haraldsdatter, past mistress of Gunnar and friend of Vigdis
 Eyolv Arneson, killer of Gunnar, avenged by Vigdis
 Koll Arneson, Eyolv's brother
 Illuge, suitor of Vigdis

References

Availability
Gunnar's Daughter is available in paperback. (New York: Penguin Classics, 1998).

1909 Norwegian novels
Historical novels
Novels about rape
20th-century Norwegian novels
Novels by Sigrid Undset
Novels set in Iceland
Novels set in Norway
Novels set in the 11th century